Dingi, "Dingi Tubewell", is one of the 44 union councils, administrative subdivisions, of Haripur District in the Khyber Pakhtunkhwa province of Pakistan Post Office Kot Najeebullah, Postal Code 22620.

 
Most of the area is agricultural and tube wells are there for irrigation.  There is a digital telephone exchange, Dingi is the gate way to Hazara region.  Dingi was declared by the Zari Tariqaiti Bank Limited as a 'Model Village' in 2008.  The main village is 2 km away from KKH. There is a private school here named Al- Mehria School. I (Muhammad Imran Pervez),  passed the matriculation examination from this school. Which is now upgraded to Higher Secondary School and College. Govt Boys and Girls primary and Higher Secondary Schools are imparting knowledge to the residents of this village. CPEC,  China Pak Economic Corridor has increased its value as the Motorway is running through this village.  Besides this Hattar economic zone will be built on the right horizon of this village.

References

Union councils of Haripur District